James Percy Owen Cowlishaw (1867–1925) was an architect in Queensland, Australia. He is best known for his Commercial Bank of Australia buildings.

References

1867 births
1925 deaths
19th-century Australian architects
20th-century Australian architects